Chloe Angelides (born May 21, 1992) is an American singer, songwriter and producer. She has written songs for numerous artists including "Zipper" for Jason Derulo for his album Talk Dirty, "Jackie (B.M.F.)" for Ciara for her album Jackie, "Burnin' Up" for Jessie J, "Pacify Her" by Melanie Martinez for her album Cry Baby, "Say Love" by JoJo for her EP III, "Paper" by Nick & Knight, "Sober" by Selena Gomez for her album Revival, "Get On Your Knees" by Nicki Minaj and has performed vocals on "Sexy Beaches" for Pitbull on his album Globalization, "Whip It!" by LunchMoney Lewis, "Ready for Love" by Felix Cartal, "How Bad You Want It (Oh Yeah)" by Sevyn Streeter and "White Lies" by Vicetone. Chloe is published by Dr. Luke's company Prescription Songs.

Biography

Chloe Angelides was born in Reston, Virginia on May 21, 1992, to a Cypriot father, and her mother who is of German descent.

Discography

As featured artist

 2013: "Survivor" (Stephen Swartz featuring Chloe Angelides)
 2014: "Sexy Beaches" (Pitbull featuring Chloe Angelides)
 2014: "White Lies" (Vicetone featuring Chloe Angelides)
 2014: "Ready for Love" (Felix Cartal featuring Chloe Angelides)
 2015: "Whip It!" (LunchMoney Lewis featuring Chloe Angelides)
 2015: "Make Up" (R. City featuring Chloe Angelides)
 2019: "Hard To Say Goodbye" (Ekali and Illenium featuring Chloe Angelides)

Other

 2013: "Crash" (Adventure Club) (Uncredited as singer)
 2017: "Under Your Skin (SeeB & R. City) (Uncredited as singer)

Songwriter and production credits

References

Living people
American women pop singers
American women singer-songwriters
1992 births
People from Reston, Virginia
21st-century American women singers
21st-century American singers
American people of Greek Cypriot descent
American people of German descent